LFHE may refer to:

 The Leadership Foundation for Higher Education
 The ICAO code for Romans Saint-Paul Airport in Romans-sur-Isère, France